Nagara Dam (Re)  is a gravity dam located in Kagawa Prefecture in Japan. The dam is used for flood control. The catchment area of the dam is 32 km2. The dam impounds about 63  ha of land when full and can store 10200 thousand cubic meters of water. The construction of the dam was started on 1995.

See also
List of dams in Japan

References

Dams in Kagawa Prefecture